The Razz Guy is a 2021 Nigerian comedy-drama film directed by Udoka Oyeka, written by Egbemawei Sammy produced by Trino Motion Pictures.

It was released across Cinemas on March 19, 2021.

Plot
When an international business merger is assigned to a rude & condescending senior executive, a curse that affects his ability to speak properly is cast on him by an office cleaner. The movie follows the story of a senior executive whose arrogance and highhandedness earns him a curse that makes him lose his ability to speak proper English ahead of a crucial international business merger deal. He must either find a way to lift the curse and secure the deal or resign to his fate.

Cast

Release
The comedy movie was shot in 2019 with the official trailer for the film was released on 17 November 2020. 
The Razz Guy premiered on 14 March 2021 and was released across cinemas on 19 March 2021.

See also
 List of Nigerian films of 2021

References

External links
 
 

2021 films
2021 comedy-drama films
Nigerian comedy films
English-language Nigerian films
Films directed by Udoka Oyeka
2020s English-language films